Haldaur is a city and a municipal board in Bijnor district in the Indian state of Uttar Pradesh.

Geography
It has an average elevation of 220 metres (721 feet). 

Haldaur is close to the district headquarters and well connected by road as well as rails. Musorie express, Siddhbali Jan Shatabdi express & Chandigarh lucknow express are some trains which pass through the Haldaur Railway station.

The town has two degree colleges, R.P.S. degree college and Gahlaut Degree College, Two famous Intermediate colleges C.D.Inter college & R.H.S.inter college and  few public schools St. Marry's convent school , Sai international, S.C.M., G.S.N., Aastha, Geeta etc, which provide good education.

The town is located on the Panipat khatima State highway. the capital of India, New Delhi is just about 175 kilometers far from the town.

FOUNDER
It was founded by Raja harvansh Singh during 18th century.

Demographics
 India census, Haldaur had a population of 19,567. Males constitute 53% of the population and females 47%. Haldaur has an average literacy rate of 71%, higher than the national average of 59.5%: male literacy is 78%, and female literacy is 64%. In Haldaur, 15% of the population is under 6 years of age.

Best schools
 st Mary's convent school haldaur

$ sai

References

Cities and towns in Bijnor district